Phillip Francis Murray Furlong (18 February 1893 – 27 November 1930) was an Australian rules footballer who played with Essendon in the Victorian Football League (VFL). He was cleared to Melbourne in 1920, but never played a senior VFL match for them.

Notes

External links 

Essendon Football Club past player profile
Demonwiki profile

1893 births
1930 deaths
Australian rules footballers from Melbourne
Essendon Football Club players
People from Carlton, Victoria